Space Ducks: Soundtrack is a compilation album by American recording artist Daniel Johnston. It was released on Daniel Johnston's Eternal Yip Eye Label in 2012, with a later, longer version released on Feraltone in 2013. It was inspired by Johnston's comic Space Ducks: An Infinite Comic Book of Musical Greatness. It also features songs from Unknown Mortal Orchestra, Eleanor Friedberger, Deer Tick, Fruit Bats, and Lavender Diamond.

Track listing 
 "Space Ducks"—Daniel Johnston
 "American Dream"—Daniel Johnston
 "Sense of Humor"—Daniel Johnston
 "Come Down"—Eleanor Friedberger
 "Evil Magic"—Fruit Bats
 "Mean Girls Give Pleasure"—Daniel Johnston
 "Moment of Laughter"—Lavender Diamond
 "Satanic Planet"—Unknown Mortal Orchestra
 "Wanting You"—Daniel Johnston
 "Mask"—Daniel Johnston
 "Mountain"—Daniel Johnston
 "Space Ducks"—Deer Tick

References 

2012 compilation albums
Daniel Johnston albums